Neil Patrick Crooks (May 16, 1938September 21, 2015) was an American lawyer. He was a justice of the Wisconsin Supreme Court from 1996 until his death in 2015. He was appointed as a county judge by a Democratic governor, later professing conservatism as a Supreme Court candidate in 1995 and 1996. In his later years, Crooks gained notice as a perceived judicial moderate and swing vote on a court otherwise divided into two ideological blocs.

Early life and career
Crooks was a native of Green Bay, Wisconsin, and graduated from the city's Premontre High School in 1956. He received a B.A. degree from St. Norbert College in 1960 and a J.D. degree from the University of Notre Dame in 1963.

From 1963-66, Crooks served as an officer in the United States Army, assigned to the Judge Advocate General's Corps in the Pentagon. After his discharge from the Army, Crooks worked for eleven years as a private practice attorney in Green Bay and as an instructor of business law at the University of Wisconsin–Green Bay.

In 1977, Crooks was appointed to the Brown County Court by Governor Martin J. Schreiber, a liberal Democrat. Crooks was designated a circuit court judge in 1978, when Wisconsin's county and circuit courts were merged.

Although appointed by Schreiber, Crooks ran for the Wisconsin Supreme Court in 1995 as a conservative; his campaign was directed by Scott Jensen, a prominent Republican legislator later convicted of criminal ethics violations. He was defeated in the general election by Marathon County circuit judge Ann Walsh Bradley but elected to the court in 1996, defeating appellate judge Ralph Adam Fine of Milwaukee after a contentious campaign.

Supreme Court service
In 1999, Crooks became enmeshed in a factional dispute on the court, aligning with justices Donald Steinmetz, William Bablitch, and Jon Wilcox against Bradley, Chief Justice Shirley Abrahamson, and Justice David T. Prosser, Jr.  The dispute arose from numerous controversies and the unsuccessful attempt of Green Bay lawyer Sharren Rose to unseat Abrahamson; Crooks had supported Rose.  By 2005, the court's justices had aligned into different blocs, now defined more closely by ideology. His participation in decisions lifting a medical malpractice damages cap and permitting a lawsuit against lead paint manufacturers disassociated him from the court's conservative bloc.

Since 2005, Crooks acted at times as a swing vote on the court, sometimes associated ideologically with Abrahamson and Bradley. Some commentators identify him as a judicial liberal, while others classify him as a "centrist" who retains strong conservative leanings.

Crooks generally joined the conservative majority's opinions, especially in criminal matters, but joined the liberal minority's dissents on certain constitutional issues and matters of court administration.

In April 2015, Crooks broke from both Abrahamson and the conservative majority in a dispute over the election of Patience Drake Roggensack as the court's chief justice. Earlier in 2015, voters had approved a referendum permitting the court's justices to elect their chief justice; throughout Wisconsin's history, the most senior justice had occupied the court's highest office. Crooks condemned Abrahamson's attempts to retain her position, which included a federal lawsuit, but did not support Roggensack's election; instead, he indicated that he would consider seeking the chief justiceship and running for reelection in 2016, an event theretofore considered unlikely.

In the wake of this dispute, and with Crooks's intentions uncertain, state judges Joe Donald, JoAnne Kloppenburg, and Rebecca Bradley filed to run for Crooks's seat in 2016.

Death
On Thursday, September 16, 2015, Crooks announced that he would not seek reelection. Crooks was absent from oral arguments the next day.  He came to the court on Monday, September 21, 2015, for a hearing, but excused himself before the hearing was over.  He was later found dead in his chambers at the Wisconsin State Capitol in Madison. He was 77.

Professional memberships and awards
While serving in 1994 as a Brown County circuit judge, Crooks was recognized as Trial Judge of the Year by the Wisconsin Chapter of the American Board of Trial Advocates.  Crooks was a law school evaluator for the American Bar Association and also a member of the Wisconsin Law Foundation Board. He was a director of the Notre Dame Law Association and a member of the James E. Doyle Chapter of the American Inns of Court.

Electoral history

Wisconsin Circuit Court (1985, 1991)

| colspan="6" style="text-align:center;background-color: #e9e9e9;"| General Election, April 2, 1985

| colspan="6" style="text-align:center;background-color: #e9e9e9;"| General Election, April 2, 1991

Wisconsin Supreme Court (1995, 1996, 2006)

| colspan="6" style="text-align:center;background-color: #e9e9e9;"| Primary Election, February 21, 1995

| colspan="6" style="text-align:center;background-color: #e9e9e9;"| General Election, April 4, 1995

| colspan="6" style="text-align:center;background-color: #e9e9e9;"| General Election, February 6, 1996

| colspan="6" style="text-align:center;background-color: #e9e9e9;"| General Election, March 19, 1996

| colspan="6" style="text-align:center;background-color: #e9e9e9;"| General Election, April 4, 2006

References

1938 births
2015 deaths
Politicians from Green Bay, Wisconsin
Military personnel from Wisconsin
Wisconsin state court judges
Justices of the Wisconsin Supreme Court
St. Norbert College alumni
Notre Dame Law School alumni
United States Army Judge Advocate General's Corps
20th-century American judges